Bai Yang (born 6 March 1998) is a Chinese footballer currently playing as a defender for Beijing Guoan.

Club career
Bai Yang would play for the Changchun Yatai youth team before having to go through arbitration to join amateur side Shenyang Xinyuanxiang and then subsequently going abroad in 2019 to join Spanish side Real Murcia. On 1 April 2021 he returned to China to join top tier club Beijing Guoan on a free transfer. He would be promoted to their senior team within the 2021 Chinese Super League season and would make his debut in a league game on 19 July 2021 against Tianjin Jinmen Tiger F.C. in a 0-0 draw.

Career statistics
.

References

External links

1998 births
Living people
Sportspeople from Zibo
Footballers from Shandong
Chinese footballers
China youth international footballers
Chinese expatriate footballers
Association football defenders
Changchun Yatai F.C. players
Real Murcia players
Real Murcia Imperial players
Beijing Guoan F.C. players
Chinese expatriate sportspeople in Spain
Expatriate footballers in Spain